Eringsboda is a locality situated in Ronneby Municipality, Blekinge County, Sweden with 299 inhabitants in 2010. On 21 December 1910, a railway was opened between Eringsboda and Älmeboda.

References 

Populated places in Ronneby Municipality